Anna Semyonovna Kamenkova (born April 27, 1953, Moscow, RSFSR, USSR) is a  Soviet and Russian actress of theater, cinema and dubbing. Honored Artist of the RSFSR (1985).

Biography

Parents Olga Kamenkova-Pavlova and  Semyon Gurevich taught Russian language and literature at school. When Ana was 9 years old, her mother died, and a great role was played by her older sister Olga.

Her first role came at age 5 in 1959 in the film  Girl Seeks Father,  for this role, she was awarded a special prize for best performance of the children's role in the Mar del Plata International Film Festival in 1960.

After such a successful debut, she received new proposals for roles, but her parents decided that a film career would interrupt her studies. Despite this, she visited the studio of artistic expression in the Palace of Pioneers (under the direction of GA Hatsrevin).

In 1974 she graduated from the Mikhail Shchepkin Higher Theatre School (workshop of Mikhail Tsaryov).

As a student, she made her debut at the Maly Theatre in the play The Makropulos Affair by Karel Chapek.

From 1974 to 1992 she worked in the Moscow Theater on Malaya Bronnaya, where she played more than a dozen roles.

Her return to the movie took place in 1975 in the lyrical cinematic tale Forest swing. Her subsequent work in the melodrama Leonid Menaker Young wife  brought the actress a real success.

Anna Kamenkova was one of the best local artists of dubbing and sound. She voiced actresses such as Sharon Stone, Barbra Streisand, Kate Winslet, Meg Ryan, Meryl Streep, Juliette Binoche, Julie Roberts, Irene Jacob, Kathleen Turner, etc.

After working for eighteen years in the Theater on Malaya Bronnaya, the actress went to the enterprise.

In 1980 she married her colleague in the theater on Malaya Bronnaya director Anatoly Spivak. In 1987 they had a son Sergei.

Selected filmography

Actress
 Girl Seeks Father (1959) as Lena
 Vasilisa the Beautiful (Василиса Прекрасная, 1977) as Vasilisa the Beautiful
 Investigation Held by ZnaToKi (Следствие ведут ЗнаТоКи, 1978) as Vasilisa the Beautiful
 Young Wife (1978) as Manya Streltsova
 Visit to Minotaur (Визит к Минотавру, 1987) as Elena Nechaeva
 You Exist (Ты есть..., 1993)
 Tests for Real Men (Тесты для настоящих мужчин, 1998)
 The Circus Princess (Принцесса цирка, 2008) as Viktoria
 Le Concert (2009) as Irina Filipova
 The Perfect Ones (Без меня, 2018) as Ksenia's mother
 Van Goghs (2019) as Masha's mother

Dubbing
 A Cruel Romance (Жестокий романс, 1984) as Larisa Ogudalova
 Gardes-Marines, Ahead! (Гардемарины, вперёд!, 1988) as Anastasia Yaguzhinskaya
 The Cat Who Walked by Herself (Кошка, которая гуляла сама по себе, 1988) as women
 Viva Gardes-Marines! (Виват, гардемарины!, 1991) as Anastasia Yaguzhinskaya
 Humiliated and Insulted (Униженные и оскорблённые, 1991) as Natasha 
 Prince Vladimir (Князь Владимир, 2006) as Princess Olga

References

External links
 
  

1953 births
Living people
Soviet film actresses
Soviet child actresses
Soviet stage actresses
Russian film actresses
Russian stage actresses
Russian television actresses
Actresses from Moscow
Honored Artists of the RSFSR
Soviet voice actresses
Russian voice actresses
20th-century Russian women